Lisle Denis Snell is a Norfolk Island politician, who from 20 March 2013 until 17 June 2015 was the final Chief Minister of Norfolk Island. He also served as Minister for Tourism. Both offices were abolished, along with the Norfolk Island Legislative Assembly in 2015 by the Government of Australia.

Snell is a Pitcairn descendant. In 2013 he stated he believed Norfolk Island could become Independent of Australia.

Before entering politics, Snell was a tour guide.

References

Year of birth missing (living people)
Living people
Heads of government of Norfolk Island
Members of the Norfolk Legislative Assembly
Tour guides
21st-century politicians